The following are the candidates who ran in the 2018 Ontario general election, that was held on June 7, 2018.

Abbreviations guide
Abbreviations of political parties used in these tables:

All – Ontario Alliance
CAP: Cultural Action Party of Ontario
CCP – Canadians' Choice Party
Comm. – Communist Party of Canada (Ontario)
CO - Consensus Ontario
CoR - Confederation of Regions Party of Ontario
FPO – Freedom Party of Ontario
Green – Green Party of Ontario
Ind. – Independent
Liberal – Ontario Liberal Party
Libert. – Ontario Libertarian Party
Mod. – Ontario Moderate Party
N. Ont – Northern Ontario Party
NDP – Ontario New Democratic Party
NOTA – None of the Above Party
NPCP - New Peoples' Choice Party
Ont - Ontario Party
PC – Progressive Conservative Party of Ontario
P – The Peoples Political Party
PSN – Party for People with Special Needs
SCC – Stop Climate Change
SNSA – Stop the New Sex-Ed Agenda
SRP - Social Reform Party of Ontario
T – Trillium Party of Ontario

Number of candidates by party

Candidates
◊ = Not seeking re-election
‡ = Running for re-election in different riding
Bolded candidates represent party leaders
Source: Elections Ontario

East

Ottawa

|-
| style="background:whitesmoke;"|Carleton
|
|Theresa Qadri
||
|Goldie Ghamari
|
|Courtney Potter
|
|Gordan Kubanek
|
|Jean-Serge Brisson
|
|Evan Nightingale
|
|Mark Dickson (Ind.)  Kevin Harris (CAP)Jay Tysick (Ont.)
||
|New District
|-
| style="background:whitesmoke;"|Kanata—Carleton
|
|Stephanie Maghnam
||
|Merrilee Fullerton
|
|John Hansen
|
|Andrew West
|
|Peter D'Entremont
|
|Robert LeBrun
|
|Jack MacLaren (T)
||
|Jack MacLarenCarleton—Mississippi Mills
|-
| style="background:whitesmoke;"|Nepean
|
|Lovina Srivastava
||
|Lisa MacLeod
|
|Zaff Ansari
|
|James O'Grady
|
|Mark Snow
|
|Raphael Louis
|
|Derrick Matthews (POT)
||
|Lisa MacLeodNepean—Carleton
|-
| style="background:whitesmoke;"|Orléans
||
|Marie-France Lalonde
|
|Cameron Montgomery
|
|Barbara Zarboni
|
|Nicholas Lapierre
|
|Gerald Bourdeau
|
|
|
|Samuel Schwisberg (Ind.)
||
|Marie-France LalondeOttawa—Orléans
|-
| style="background:whitesmoke;"|Ottawa Centre
|
|Yasir Naqvi
|
|Colleen McCleery
||
|Joel Harden
|
|Cherie Wong
|
|Bruce Faulkner
|
|Marc Adornato
|
|Stuart Ryan (Comm.) James Sears (CCP) 
||
|Yasir Naqvi
|-
| style="background:whitesmoke;"|Ottawa South
||
|John Fraser
|
|Karin Howard
|
|Eleanor Fast
|
|Les Schram
|
|Robert Daigneault
|
|
|
|Larry Wasslen (Comm.)
||
|John Fraser
|-
| style="background:whitesmoke;"|Ottawa—Vanier
||
|Nathalie Des Rosiers
|
|Fadi Nemr
|
|Lyra Evans
|
|Sheilagh McLean
|
|Ken Lewis
|
|Keegan Bennett
|
|David McGruer (FPO)
||
|Nathalie Des Rosiers
|-
| style="background:whitesmoke;"|Ottawa West—Nepean
|
|Bob Chiarelli
||
|Jeremy Roberts
|
|Chandra Pasma
|
|Pat Freel
|
|Nicholas Paliga
|
|Colin Pritchard
|
|
||
|Bob Chiarelli
|}

Eastern Ontario

|-
| style="background:whitesmoke;"|Bay of Quinte
|	
|Robert Quaiff
||
|Todd Smith
|
|Joanne Bélanger
|
|Mark Daye
|
|Cindy Davidson
|
|Paul Bordonaro (Ind.) James Engelsman (T)
||
|Todd SmithPrince Edward—Hastings
|-
| style="background:whitesmoke;"|Glengarry—Prescott—Russell
| 
|Pierre Leroux
||
|Amanda Simard
|
|Bonnie Jean-Louis
|
|Daniel Reid
|
|Darcy Donnelly
|
|Joël Charbonneau (Ont.)
||
|Grant Crack ◊
|-
| style="background:whitesmoke;"|Hastings—Lennox and Addington
|
|Tim Rigby
||
|Daryl Kramp
|
|Nate Smelle
|
|Sari Watson
|
|Greg Scholfield
|
|Lonnie Herrington (T)
||
|New District
|-
| style="background:whitesmoke;"|Kingston and the Islands
|
|Sophie Kiwala
|
|Gary Bennett
||
|Ian Arthur
|
|Robert Kiley
|
|Heather Cunningham
|
|Andre Imbeault (T)
||
|Sophie Kiwala
|-
| style="background:whitesmoke;"|Lanark—Frontenac—Kingston
|
|Amanda Pulker-Mok
||
|Randy Hillier
|
|Ramsey Hart
|
|Anita Payne
|
|Steve Gebhardt
|
|John McEwen (Ind.)
||
|Randy HillierLanark—Frontenac—Lennox and Addington
|-
| style="background:whitesmoke;"|Leeds—Grenville—Thousand Islands and Rideau Lakes
|
|David Henderson
||
|Steve Clark
|
|Michelle Taylor
|
|Derek Morley
|
|Bill Buckley
|
|
||
|Steve ClarkLeeds—Grenville
|-
| style="background:whitesmoke;"|Renfrew—Nipissing—Pembroke
|
|Jackie Agnew
||
|John Yakabuski
|
|Ethel LaValley
|
|Anna Dolan
|
|Jesse Wood
|
|Murray Reid (CoR)
||
|John Yakabuski
|-
| style="background:whitesmoke;"|Stormont—Dundas—South Glengarry
|
|Heather Megill
||
|Jim McDonell
|
|Marc Benoit
|
|Elaine Kennedy
|
|Sabile Trimm
|
|
||
|Jim McDonell
|}

Central Ontario

|-
| style="background:whitesmoke;"|Barrie—Innisfil
|
|Ann Hoggarth
||
|Andrea Khanjin
|
|Pekka Reinio
|
|Bonnie North
|
|Brett Dorion
|
|Alexander Ryzhykh(Mod.) Stacey Surkova (T) Jake Tucker (CCP)
||
|Ann HoggarthBarrie
|-
| style="background:whitesmoke;"|Barrie—Springwater—Oro-Medonte
|
|Jeff Kerk
||
|Doug Downey
|
|Dan Janssen
|
|Keenan Aylwin
|
|Mark Mitchell
|
|Ram Faerber (Ind.)  Darren Roskam (NOTA) Michael Tuck (Ind.)
||
|New District
|-
| style="background:whitesmoke;"|Bruce—Grey—Owen Sound
|
|Francesca Dobbyn
||
|Bill Walker
|
|Karen Gventer
|
|Don Marshall
|
|Jay Miller
|
|Janice Kaikkonen (CO) Enos Martin (All.) Liz Marshall (T)
||
|Bill Walker
|-
| style="background:whitesmoke;"|Dufferin—Caledon
|
|Bob Gordanier
||
|Sylvia Jones
|
|Andrea Mullarkey
|
|Laura Campbell
|
|Jeff Harris
|
|Stephen McKendrick (CO) Andrew Nowell (T)
||
|Sylvia Jones
|-
| style="background:whitesmoke;"|Haliburton—Kawartha Lakes—Brock
|
|Brooklynne Cramp-Waldinsperger
||
|Laurie Scott
|
|Zac Miller
| 
|Lynn Therien
|
|Gene Balfour
|
|Chuck MacMillan (CO) Thomas Rhyno (NOTA)
||
|Laurie Scott
|-
| style="background:whitesmoke;"|Northumberland—Peterborough South
|
|Lou Rinaldi
||
|David Piccini
|
|Jana Papuckoski
|
|Jeff Wheeldon
|
|John O'Keefe
|
|Paul Cragg (SCC) Derek Sharp (T)
||
|Lou RinaldiNorthumberland—Quinte West
|-
| style="background:whitesmoke;"|Peterborough—Kawartha
|
|Jeff Leal
||
|Dave Smith
|
|Sean Conway
|
|Gianne Broughton
|
|Jacob Currier
|
|Ken Ranney (SCC) Robert Roddick (T)
||
|Jeff LealPeterborough
|-
| style="background:whitesmoke;"|Simcoe—Grey
|	
|Dan Hambly
||
|Jim Wilson
|
|David Matthews
|
|Jesseca Perry
|
|John Wright
|
| 
||
|Jim Wilson
|-
| style="background:whitesmoke;"|Simcoe North
|	
|Gerry Marshall
||
|Jill Dunlop
|
|Elizabeth Van Houtte
|
|Valerie Powell
|
|Cynthia Sneath
|
|
||
|Patrick Brown ◊
|-
| style="background:whitesmoke;"|York—Simcoe
|
|Loralea Carruthers
||
|Caroline Mulroney
|
|Dave Szollosy
|
|Alexandra Zalucky
|
|Ioan Silviu Druma-Strugariu
|
|Franco Colavecchia (Mod.)
||
|Julia Munro ◊
|}

905 Belt

Durham

|-
| style="background:whitesmoke;"|Ajax
|
|Joe Dickson
||
|Rod Phillips
|
|Monique Hughes
|
|Stephen Leahy
|
|Marsha Haynes
|
|Kevin Brackley (Ind.) Frank Lopez (NOTA)
||
| Joe DicksonAjax—Pickering
|-
| style="background:whitesmoke;"|Durham
|
|Granville Anderson
||
|Lindsey Park
|
|Joel Usher
|
|Michelle Corbett
|
|Ryan Robinson
|
|
||
| Granville Anderson
|-
| style="background:whitesmoke;"|Oshawa
|
|Makini Smith
|
|Bob Chapman
||
|Jennifer French
|
|Deborah Ellis
|
|Jeanne Gory
|
|Cheryl Kelly (NOTA)
||
| Jennifer French
|-
| style="background:whitesmoke;"|Pickering—Uxbridge
|
|Ibrahim Daniyal
||
|Peter Bethlenfalvy
|
|Nerissa Cariño
|
|Adam Narraway
|
|Brendan Reilly
|
|Netalia Duboisky (Mod.) Michelle Francis (N/A) William Myers (Ind.) Eric Sivadas (Ind.)
||
| Tracy MacCharles ◊Pickering—Scarborough East
|-
| style="background:whitesmoke;"|Whitby
|
|Leisa Washington
||
|Lorne Coe
|
|Niki Lundquist
|
|Stacey Leadbetter
|
|Ronad Halabi
|
|Doug Thom (FPO)
||
| Lorne CoeWhitby—Oshawa
|}

Peel

|-
| style="background:whitesmoke;"|Brampton Centre
|
|Safdar Hussain
|
|Harjit Jaswal
||
|Sara Singh
|
|Laila Zarrabi Yan
|
|Andrew Hosie
|
|Mehdi Pakzad
|
|Bill Oprel (T)
||
|New District
|-
| style="background:whitesmoke;"|Brampton East
|
|Parminder Singh
|
|Sudeep Verma
||
|Gurratan Singh
|
|Raquel Fronte
|
|Daniele Cerasoli
|
|
|
|Gurdeep Dhothar (T)
||
| VacantBramalea—Gore—Malton
|-
| style="background:whitesmoke;"|Brampton North
|
|Harinder Malhi
|
|Ripudaman Dhillon
||
|Kevin Yarde
|
|Pauline Thornham
|
|Gregory Argue
|
|
|
|
||
|Harinder Malhi Brampton—Springdale
|-
| style="background:whitesmoke;"|Brampton South
|
|Sukhwant Thethi
||
|Prabmeet Sarkaria
|
|Paramjit Gill
|
|Lindsay Falt
| 
|Brian Watson
|
|
|
|John Grant (T) Ted Harlson (FPO)
||
| New District
|-
| style="background:whitesmoke;"|Brampton West
|
|Vic Dhillon
||
|Amarjot Sandhu
|
|Jagroop Singh
|
|Julie Guillemet-Ackerman
|
|David Shaw
|
|
|
|Surjit Sahota (Comm.)
||
| Vic Dhillon
|-
| style="background:whitesmoke;"|Mississauga Centre
|
|Bobbie Daid
||
|Natalia Kusendova
|
|Laura Kaminker
|
|Noah Gould
|
|Farouk Giga
|
|
|
|Viktor Chornopyskyy (Mod.) Alex Pacis (SNSEA)
||
| New District
|-
| style="background:whitesmoke;"|Mississauga East—Cooksville
|
|Dipika Damerla
||
|Kaleed Rasheed
|
|Tom Takacs
|
|Basia Krzyzanowski
|
|Mark Donaldson
|
|Leonard Little
|
|Mykola Ponomarenko (Mod.)
||
| Dipika Damerla
|-
| style="background:whitesmoke;"|Mississauga—Erin Mills
|
|Imran Mian
||
|Sheref Sabawy
|
|Farina Hassan
|
|Libby Yuill
|
|Pieter Liem
|
|Grzegorz Nowacki
|
|Ben Skura (FPO)
||
|Harinder Takhar ◊Mississauga—Erindale
|-
| style="background:whitesmoke;"|Mississauga—Lakeshore
|
|Charles Sousa
||
|Rudy Cuzzetto
|
|Boris Rosolak
|
|Lloyd Jones
|
|Jay Ward
|
|Kenny Robinson
|
|Felicia Trigiani (Vegan)
||
| Charles SousaMississauga South
|-
| style="background:whitesmoke;"|Mississauga—Malton
|
|Amrit Mangat
||
|Deepak Anand
|
|Nikki Clarke
|
|Eryn Sylvester
|
|Michelle Ciupka
|
|Alex Vezina
|
|Caroline Roach (Ind.)
||
| Amrit MangatMississauga—Brampton South
|-
| style="background:whitesmoke;"|Mississauga—Streetsville
|
|Bob Delaney
||
|Nina Tangri
|
|Jacqueline Gujarati
|
|Abhijeet Manay
|
|Richard Levesque
|
|Greg Vezina
|
|
||
| Bob Delaney
|}

York

|-
| style="background:whitesmoke;"|Aurora—Oak Ridges—Richmond Hill
|
|Naheed Yaqubian
||
|Michael Parsa
|
|Katrina Sale
|
|Stephanie Duncan
|
|Serge Korovitsyn
|
|Abu Alam (SRP) Margarita Barsky (Mod.) Jenusz Butylkin (FPO) Santiago DeSilva (NOTA)
||
|New District
|-
| style="background:whitesmoke;"|King—Vaughan
|
|Marilyn Iafrate
||
|Stephen Lecce
|
|Andrea Beal
|
|Greg Locke
|
|Yan Simkin
|
|Tatiana Babitch (Mod.) Roman Evtukh (T)
||
|New District
|-
| style="background:whitesmoke;"|Markham—Stouffville
|
|Helena Jaczek
||
|Paul Calandra
|
|Kingsley Kwok
|
|Jose Etcheverry
|
|Paul Balfour
|
|Yuri Duboisky (Mod.)
||
| Helena JaczekOak Ridges—Markham
|-
| style="background:whitesmoke;"|Markham—Thornhill
|
|Juanita Nathan
||
|Logan Kanapathi
|
|Cindy Hackelberg
|
|Caryn Bergmann
|
|David Nadler
|
|Jeff Kuah (Ind.)
||
|New District
|-
| style="background:whitesmoke;"|Markham—Unionville
|
|Amanda Yeung Collucci
| |
|Billy Pang
|
|Sylvie David
|
|Deborah Moolman
|
|Allen Small
|
|Anastasia Afonina (Mod.)
||
| Michael Chan ◊
|-
| style="background:whitesmoke;"|Newmarket—Aurora
|
|Chris Ballard
||
|Christine Elliott
|
|Melissa Williams
|
|Michelle Bourdeau
|
|Lori Robbins
|
|Dorian Baxter (Ind.) Denis Gorlynskiy (Mod.) Denis Van Decker (NOTA) Bob Yaciuk (T)
||
| Chris Ballard
|-
| style="background:whitesmoke;"|Richmond Hill
|
|Reza Moridi
||
|Daisy Wai
|
|Marco Coletta
|
|Walter Bauer
|
|Igor Bily
|
|
||
| Reza Moridi
|-
| style="background:whitesmoke;"|Thornhill
| 
|Sabi Ahsan
||
|Gila Martow
|
|Ezra Tanen
|
|Rachel Dokhoian
|
|Mike Holmes
|
|Aleksei Polyakov (Mod.) Above Znoneofthe (NOTA)
||
| Gila Martow
|-
| style="background:whitesmoke;"|Vaughan—Woodbridge
|
|Steven Del Duca
||
|Michael Tibollo
|
|Sandra Lozano
|
|Michael DiPasquale
|
|Paolo Fabrizio
|
|
||
| Steven Del DucaVaughan
|}

Toronto

Scarborough

|-
| style="background:whitesmoke;"|Scarborough—Agincourt
|
|Soo Wong
||
|Aris Babikian
|
|Tasleem Riaz
|
|Lydia West
|
|Mark Sinclair
|
|Carlos Lacuna
|
|Rubina Ansary (Mod.) Jude Coutinho (Ind.) Badih Rawdah (P)
||
|Soo Wong
|-
| style="background:whitesmoke;"|Scarborough Centre
|
|Mazhar Shafiq
||
|Christina Mitas
|
|Zeyd Bismilla
|
|Sanjin Zeco
|
|Matthew Dougherty
|
|Chris Mellor
|
|
||
|Brad Duguid ◊
|-
| style="background:whitesmoke;"|Scarborough—Guildwood
||
|Mitzie Hunter
|
|Roshan Nallaratnam
|
|Tom Packwood
|
|Linda Rice
|
|Hamid-Reza Dehnad-Tabatabaei
|
|George Garvida
|
|Heather Dunbar (P) Benjamin Mbaegbu (N/A) Wanda Ryan (PSN)
||
|Mitzie Hunter
|-
| style="background:whitesmoke;"|Scarborough North
|
|Chin Lee
||
|Raymond Cho
|
|Dwayne Morgan
|
|Nicole Peltier
|
|Sean Morgan
|
|
|
|
||
| Raymond ChoScarborough—Rouge River
|-
| style="background:whitesmoke;"|Scarborough—Rouge Park
|
|Sumi Shan
||
|Vijay Thanigasalam
|
|Felicia Samuel
|
|Priyan De Silva
|
|Todd Byers
|
|Amit Pitamber
|
|
||
| New District
|-
| style="background:whitesmoke;"|Scarborough Southwest
|
|Lorenzo Berardinetti
|
|Gary Ellis
||
|Doly Begum
|
|David Del Grande
|
|James Speirs
|
|Bobby Turley
|
|Allen Atkinson (NOTA)Willie Little (PSN)
||
| Lorenzo Berardinetti
|}

North York and North Toronto

|-
| style="background:whitesmoke;"|Don Valley East
||
|Michael Coteau
|
|Denzil Minnan-Wong
|
|Khalid Ahmed
|
|Mark Wong
|
|Justin Robinson
|
|Wayne Simmons (FPO)
||
|Michael Coteau
|-
| style="background:whitesmoke;"|Don Valley North
|
|Shelley Carroll
||
|Vincent Ke
|
|Akil Sadikali
|
|Janelle Yanishewski
|
|Sarah Matthews
|
|Alexander Verstraten (NOTA)
||
|New District
|-
|style="background:whitesmoke;"|Don Valley West
||
|Kathleen Wynne
|
|Jon Kieran
|
|Amara Possian
|
|Morgan Bailey
|
|John Kittredge
|
|Patrick Knight (CEP)
||
|Kathleen Wynne
|-
| style="background:whitesmoke;"|Eglinton—Lawrence
|
|Michael Colle
||
|Robin Martin
|
|Robyn Vilde
|
|Reuben DeBoer
|
|Michael Staffieri
|
|Lionel Poizner (T)
||
| Michael Colle
|-
| style="background:whitesmoke;"|Willowdale
|
|David Zimmer
||
|Stan Cho
|
|Saman Tabasinejad
|
|Randi Ramdeen
|
|Catherine MacDonald-Robertson
|
|Birinder Ahluwalia (Ind.)
||
| David Zimmer
|-
| style="background:whitesmoke;"|York Centre
|
|Ramon Estaris 
||
|Roman Baber
|
|Andrea Vásquez Jiménez 
|
|Roma Lyon
|
|Benjamin Kamminga
|
|Cherie Ann Day (NOTA) Alexander Leonov (Mod.)
||
| Monte Kwinter ◊
|}

Toronto and East York

|-
| style="background:whitesmoke;"|Beaches—East York
|
|Arthur Potts
|
|Sarah Mallo
||
|Rima Berns-McGown
|
|Debra Scott
|
|Thomas Armstrong
|
|Andrew Balodis (Ind.) Eric Brazau (CAP) Tony Chipman (P) Regina Mundrugo (PSN) Joe Ring (NOTA) Bahman Yazdanfar (CCP)
||
|Arthur Potts
|-
| style="background:whitesmoke;"|Davenport
|
|Cristina Martins
|
|Federico Sanchez
||
|Marit Stiles
|
|Kirsten Snider
|
|Nunzio Venuto
|
|Franz Cauchi (FPO) Chai Kalevar (N/A) Dave McKee (Comm.) Troy J. Young (P)
||
|Cristina Martins
|-
| style="background:whitesmoke;"|Parkdale—High Park
|
|Nadia Guerrera
|
|Adam Pham
||
|Bhutila Karpoche
|
|Halyna Zalucky
|
|Matthias Nunno
|
|Jay Watts (Comm.)
||
| Vacant
|-
| style="background:whitesmoke;"|Spadina—Fort York
|
|Han Dong
|
|Iris Yu
||
|Chris Glover
|
|Rita Bilerman
|
|Erik Malmholt
|
|Adam Nobody (NOTA) Queenie Yu (SNSA)
||
|Han DongTrinity—Spadina
|-
| style="background:whitesmoke;"|Toronto Centre
|
|David Morris
|
|Meredith Cartwright
||
|Suze Morrison
|
|Adam Sommerfeld
|
|Judi Falardeau
|
|Kevin Clarke (P) Wanda Fountain (CEP) Cameron James (NPCP) Dan King (PSN) Theresa Snell (SNSA)
||
| Vacant
|-
| style="background:whitesmoke;"|Toronto—Danforth
|
|Li Koo
|
|Patricia Kalligosfyris
||
|Peter Tabuns
|
|Andrew Trotter
|
|Paul Layton
|
|Ivan Byard (Comm.) John Kladitis (Ind.) John Richardson (Ind.)
||
| Peter Tabuns
|-
| style="background:whitesmoke;"|Toronto—St. Paul's
|
|Jess Spindler
|
|Andrew Kirsch
||
|Jill Andrew
|
|Teresa Pun
|
|Jekiah Dunavant
|
|Marina Doshchitsina (Mod.)
||
| VacantSt. Paul's
|-
| style="background:whitesmoke;"|University—Rosedale
| 
|Jo-Ann Davis
|
|Gillian Smith
||
|Jessica Bell
|
|Tim Grant
|
|Ryan Swim
|
|Daryl Christoff (NPCP) Paulo Figueiras (Vegan) Doug MacLeod (Ind.) Hilton Milan (PSN)
||
|New District
|}

Etobicoke and York

|-
| style="background:whitesmoke;"|Etobicoke Centre
|
|Yvan Baker
||
|Kinga Surma
|
|Erica Kelly
|
|Shawn Rizvi
|
|Basil Mummery
|
|Paul Fromm (CCP) Wallace Richards (Ind.)
||
|Yvan Baker
|-
| style="background:whitesmoke;"|Etobicoke—Lakeshore
|
|Peter Milczyn
||
|Christine Hogarth
|
|Phil Trotter
|
|Chris Caldwell
|
|Mark Wrzesniewski
|
|Ian Lytvyn (Mod.)
||
|Peter Milczyn
|-
| style="background:whitesmoke;"|Etobicoke North
|
|Shafiq Qaadri
||
|Doug Ford
|
|Mahamud Amin
|
|Nancy Kaur Ghuman
|
|Brianne Lefebvre
|
|
||
|Shafiq Qaadri
|-
| style="background:whitesmoke;"|Humber River—Black Creek
|
|Deanna Sgro
|
|Cyma Musarat
||
|Tom Rakocevic
|
|Kirsten Bennett
|
|Jennifer Ochoa
| 
|Scott Aitchison (CO) Lucy Guerrero (T)
||
|Mario Sergio ◊York West
|-
| style="background:whitesmoke;"|York South—Weston
|
|Laura Albanese
|
|Mark DeMontis
||
|Faisal Hassan
|
|Grad Murray
|
|Bonnie Hu
|
|
||
| Laura Albanese
|}

Hamilton, Halton and Niagara

Halton

|-
| style="background:whitesmoke;"|Burlington
|
|Eleanor McMahon
||
|Jane McKenna
|
|Andrew Drummond
|
|Vince Fiorito
|
|Jim Gilchrist
|
|Nadine Bentham
|
|Peter Rusin (CO)
||
|Eleanor McMahon
|-
| style="background:whitesmoke;"|Milton
|
|Indira Naidoo-Harris
||
|Parm Gill
|
|Brendan Smyth
|
|Eleanor Hayward
|
|Benjamin Cunningham
|
|
|
|Enam Ahmed (SRP)
||
| Indira Naidoo-Harris Halton
|-
| style="background:whitesmoke;"|Oakville
|
|Kevin Flynn
||
|Stephen Crawford
|
|Lesley Sprague
|
|Emily DeSousa
|
|Spencer Oklobdzija
|
|
|
|
||
|Kevin Flynn
|-
| style="background:whitesmoke;"|Oakville North—Burlington
|
|Alvin Tedjo
||
|Effie Triantafilopoulos
|
|Saima Zaidi
|
|Marianne Workman
|
|Charles Zach
|
|
|
|Frank DeLuca (T)
||
| New District
|}

Hamilton

|-
| style="background:whitesmoke;"|Flamborough—Glanbrook
|
|Judi Partridge
||
|Donna Skelly
|
|Melissa McGlashan
|
|Janet Errygers
|
|Glenn Langton
|
|Rudy Miller
|
|Roman Sarachman (T)
||
|New District
|-
| style="background:whitesmoke;"|Hamilton Centre
|
|Deirdre Pike
|
|Dionne Duncan
||
|Andrea Horwath
|
|Jason Lopez
|
|Robert Young
|
|Tony Lemma	
|
|Maria Anastasiou (Ind.) Mary Ellen Campbell (Comm.)
||
|Andrea Horwath
|-
| style="background:whitesmoke;"|Hamilton East—Stoney Creek
|
|Jennifer Stebbing
|
|Akash Grewal
||
|Paul Miller
|
|Brian Munroe
|
|Allan DeRoo
|
|Linda Chenoweth
|
|Lucina Monroy (NPCP)
||
| Paul Miller
|-
| style="background:whitesmoke;"|Hamilton Mountain
|
|Damin Starr
|
|Esther Pauls
||
|Monique Taylor
|
|David Urquhart
|
|Kristofer Maves
|
|Scott Miller
|
|
||
| Monique Taylor
|-
| style="background:whitesmoke;"|Hamilton West—Ancaster—Dundas
|
|Ted McMeekin
|
|Ben Levitt
||
|Sandy Shaw
|
|Peter Ormond
|
|Nicholas Dushko
|
|Stephanie Davies
|
|Jim Enos (Ind.)
||
| Ted McMeekinAncaster—Dundas—Flamborough—Westdale
|}

Niagara

|-
| style="background:whitesmoke;"|Niagara Centre
|
|Benoit Mercier
|
|April Jeffs
||
|Jeff Burch
|
|Joe Dias
|
|Patrick Pietruszko
|
|Joe Crawford
|
|Dario Smagata-Bryan (P) Steven Soos (Ind.)
||
| Cindy Forster ◊Welland
|-
| style="background:whitesmoke;"|Niagara Falls
|
|Dean Demizio 
|
|Chuck McShane
||
|Wayne Gates
|
|Karen Fraser
|
|Shaun Somers
|
|
|
|Goran Zubic (Mod.)
||
| Wayne Gates
|-
| style="background:whitesmoke;"|Niagara West
|
|Joe Kanee
||
|Sam Oosterhoff
|
|Curtis Fric
|
|Jessica Tillmanns
|
|Stefanos Karatopis
|
|
|
|Geoffrey E. Barton (MPO)
||
|Sam OosterhoffNiagara West—Glanbrook
|-
| style="background:whitesmoke;"|St. Catharines
|
|Jim Bradley
|
|Sandie Bellows
||
|Jennie Stevens
|
|Colin Ryrie
|
|Daniel Tisi
|
|Jim Fannon
|
|Saleh Waziruddin (Comm.) Duke Willis (CAP)
||
| Jim Bradley
|}

Midwestern Ontario

|-
| style="background:whitesmoke;"|Brantford—Brant
|
|Ruby Toor
||
|Will Bouma
|
|Alex Felsky
|
|Ken Burns
|
|Rob Ferguson
|
|Nicholas Archer (NOTA) Leslie Bory (CCP) John Turmel (Paupers) Dave Wrobel (Ont.)
||
|Dave Levac ◊ Brant
|-
| style="background:whitesmoke;"|Cambridge
|
|Kathryn McGarry
||
|Belinda Karahalios
|
|Marjorie Knight
|
|Michele Braniff
|
|Allan Dettweiler
|
|
||
|Kathryn McGarry
|-
| style="background:whitesmoke;"|Guelph
|
|Sly Castaldi
|
|Ray Ferraro
| 
|Agnieszka (Aggie) Mlynarz
||
|Mike Schreiner
|
|Michael Riehl
|
|Juanita Burnett (Comm.) Thomas Mooney (Ont.) Paul Taylor (NOTA)
||
|Liz Sandals ◊ 
|-
| style="background:whitesmoke;"|Haldimand—Norfolk
|
|Dan Matten 
||
|Toby Barrett
|
|Danielle Du Sablon
|
|Anne Faulkner
|
|Christopher Rosser
|
|Wasyl Luczkiw (MPO) Dan Preston (NOTA) Carolyn Ritchie (Paupers) Thecla Ross (FPO)
||
| Toby Barrett
|-
| style="background:whitesmoke;"|Huron—Bruce
|
|Don Matheson
||
|Lisa Thompson
| 
|Jan Johnstone
|
|Nicholas Wendler
|
|Ronald Stephens
|
|Gerrie Huenemoerder (All.)
||
|Lisa Thompson
|-
| style="background:whitesmoke;"|Kitchener Centre
|
|Daiene Vernile
|
|Mary Henein Thorn
||
|Laura Mae Lindo
|
|Stacey Danckert
|
|Jason Erb
|
|Chris Carr (NOTA) Martin Suter (Comm.)
||
| Daiene Vernile
|-
| style="background:whitesmoke;"|Kitchener—Conestoga
|
|Joe Gowing
||
|Mike Harris Jr.
|
|Kelly Dick
|
|Bob Jonkman
|
|Daniel Benoy
|
|Dan Holt (CO)
||
|Michael Harris ◊ 
|-
| style="background:whitesmoke;"|Kitchener South—Hespeler
|
|Surekha Shenoy
||
|Amy Fee
|
|Fitz Vanderpool
|
|David Weber
|
|Nathan Lajeunesse
|
|Narine Sookram (Ind.)
||
| New District
|-
| style="background:whitesmoke;"|Oxford
|
|James Howard
||
|Ernie Hardeman
|
|Tara King
|
|Al De Jong
|
|Chris Swift
|
|Tim Hodges (FPO) David Sikal (Ind.) Robert Van Ryswyck (Ont.)
||
| Ernie Hardeman
|-
| style="background:whitesmoke;"|Perth—Wellington
|
|Brendan Knight
||
|Randy Pettapiece
|
|Michael O'Brien
|
|Lisa Olsen
|
|Scott Marshall
|
|Paul McKendrick (CO) Rob Smeenk (FPO) Andrew Stanton (All.)
||
| Randy Pettapiece
|-
| style="background:whitesmoke;"|Waterloo
|
|Dorothy McCabe
|
|Dan Weber
||
|Catherine Fife
|
|Zdravko Gunjevic 
|
|Andrew Allison
|
|
||
| Catherine FifeKitchener—Waterloo
|-
| style="background:whitesmoke;"|Wellington—Halton Hills
|
|Jon Hurst
||
|Ted Arnott
|
|Diane Ballantyne
|
|Dave Rodgers
|
|Jadon Pfeiffer
|
|
||
| Ted Arnott
|}

Southwestern Ontario

|-
| style="background:whitesmoke;"|Chatham-Kent—Leamington
|
|Margaret Schleier Stahl
||
|Rick Nicholls
|
|Jordan McGrail
|
|Mark Vercouteren
|
|
|
|Drew Simpson (Ind.)
||
|Rick NichollsChatham-Kent—Essex
|-
| style="background:whitesmoke;"|Elgin—Middlesex—London
|
|Carlie Forsythe
||
|Jeff Yurek
|
|Amanda Stratton
|
|Bronagh Morgan
|
|Richard Styve
|
|Henri Barrette (POT) Dave Plumb (FPO)
||
|Jeff Yurek
|-
| style="background:whitesmoke;"|Essex
|
|Kate Festeryga
| 
|Chris Lewis
||
|Taras Natyshak
|
|Nancy Pancheshan
|
|
|
|
||
|Taras Natyshak
|-
| style="background:whitesmoke;"|Lambton—Kent—Middlesex
|
|Mike Radan
||
|Monte McNaughton
|
|Todd Case
|
|Anthony Li
|
|Brad Greulich
|
|Brian Everaert (T)
||
| Monte McNaughton
|-
| style="background:whitesmoke;"|London—Fanshawe
|
|Lawvin Hadisi
|
|Eric Weniger
||
|Teresa Armstrong
|
|Lisa Carriere
|
|Henryk Szymczyszyn
|
|Stephen Campbell (NOTA) Rob Small (FPO)
||
| Teresa Armstrong
|-
| style="background:whitesmoke;"|London North Centre
|
|Kate Graham
|
|Susan Truppe
||
|Terence Kernaghan
|
|Carol Dyck
|
|Calvin McKay
|
|Paul McKeever (FPO) Clara Sorrenti (Comm.)
||
| Deb Matthews ◊ 
|-
| style="background:whitesmoke;"|London West
|
|Jonathan Hughes
|
|Andrew Lawton
||
|Peggy Sattler
|
|Pamela Reid
|
|Jacques Boudreau 
|
|Brad Harness (CO) Michael Lewis (Comm.) Tracey Pringle (FPO)
||
| Peggy Sattler
|-
| style="background:whitesmoke;"|Sarnia—Lambton
|
|Neil Wereley
||
|Bob Bailey
|
|Kathy Alexander
|
|Kevin Shaw
|
|
|
|Andy Bruziewicz(T) Fanina R. Kodre (N/A) Jeff Lozier (NOTA)
||
| Bob Bailey
|-
| style="background:whitesmoke;"|Windsor—Tecumseh
|
|Remy Boulbol 
|
|Mohammad Latif
||
|Percy Hatfield
|
|Henry Oulevey
|
|
|
|Laura Chesnik (Ind.)
||
| Percy Hatfield
|-
| style="background:whitesmoke;"|Windsor West
|
|Rino Bortolin
|
|Adam Ibrahim
||
|Lisa Gretzky
|
|Krysta Glovasky-Ridsdale
|
|
|
|Chad Durocher (NOTA)
||
| Lisa Gretzky
|}

Northern Ontario

Northeastern Ontario

|-
| style="background:whitesmoke;"|Algoma—Manitoulin
|
| Charles Fox
|
|Jib Turner
||
|Michael Mantha
|
|Justin Tilson
|
|Kalena Mallon-Ferguson
|
|Tommy Lee
|
|
||
|Michael Mantha
|-
| style="background:whitesmoke;"|Mushkegowuk—James Bay
|
|Gaëtan Baillargeon
|
|André Robichaud
||
|Guy Bourgouin
|
|Sarah Hutchinson
|
|Vanda Marshall
|
|Jacques Joseph Ouellette
|
|Fauzia Sadiq (CoR)
||
| New District
|-
| style="background:whitesmoke;"|Nickel Belt
|
|Tay Butt
|
|Jo-Ann Cardinal
||
|France Gélinas
|
|Bill Crumplin
|
|James Chretien
|
|Matthew Del Papa
|
|Kevin R Brault (CO) Bailey Burch-Belanger (NOTA)
||
|France Gélinas
|-
| style="background:whitesmoke;"|Nipissing
|
|Stephen Glass
||
|Vic Fedeli
|
|Henri Giroux
|
|Kris Rivard
|
|Bond Keevil
|
|Trevor Holliday
|
|
||
| Vic Fedeli
|-
| style="background:whitesmoke;"|Parry Sound—Muskoka
|
|Brenda Rhodes
||
|Norm Miller
|
|Erin Horvath
|
|Matt Richter
|
|Christopher Packer
|
|
|
|Joshua Macdonald (NOTA) Jeff Mole (Ind.)
||
| Norm Miller
|-
| style="background:whitesmoke;"|Sault Ste. Marie
|
|Jaclynne Hamel
||
|Ross Romano
|
|Michele McCleave-Kennedy
|
|Kara Flannigan
|
|Lance Brizard 
|
|Sandy Holmberg
|
|
||
| Ross Romano
|-
| style="background:whitesmoke;"|Sudbury
|
|Glenn Thibeault
|
|Troy Crowder
||
|Jamie West
|
|David Robinson
|
|James Wendler 
|
|
|
|Mila Chavez Wong (CO) David J. Popescu (Ind.) David Sylvestre (NOTA)
||
| Glenn Thibeault
|-
| style="background:whitesmoke;"|Timiskaming—Cochrane
|
|Brian Johnson 
|
|Margaret Williams
||
|John Vanthof
|
|Casey Lalonde
|
|Lawrence Schnarr
|
|Shawn Poirier
|
|
||
| John Vanthof
|-
| style="background:whitesmoke;"|Timmins
|
|Mickey Auger
| 
|Yvan Genier
||
|Gilles Bisson
|
|Lucas Schinbeckler
|
|Jozef Bauer
|
|Gary Schaap
|
|
||
| Gilles Bisson  Timmins—James Bay
|}

Northwestern Ontario

|-
| style="background:whitesmoke;"|Kenora—Rainy River
|
|Karen Kejick
||
|Greg Rickford
|
|Glen Archer
|
|Ember McKillop
|
|
|
|
|
|
||
|Sarah Campbell ◊
|-
| style="background:whitesmoke;"|Kiiwetinoong
|
|Doug Lawrance
|
|Clifford Bull 
||
|Sol Mamakwa
|
|Christine Penner Polle
|
|
|
|Kenneth Jones
|
|
||
| New District
|-
| style="background:whitesmoke;"|Thunder Bay—Atikokan
|
|Bill Mauro
| 
|Brandon Postuma
||
|Judith Monteith-Farrell
|
|John Northey
|
|Dorothy Snell
|
|David Bruno
|
|
||
| Bill Mauro
|-
| style="background:whitesmoke;"|Thunder Bay—Superior North
||
|Michael Gravelle
|
|Derek Parks
|
|Lise Vaugeois
|
|Amanda Moddejonge
|
|Tony Gallo
|
|Andy Wolff
|
|Louise Ewen (T)
||
| Michael Gravelle
|}

Notes

References

Candidates in Ontario provincial elections
Ontario 42nd
2018 in Ontario
2018